Marcel Arland (5 July 1899, Varennes-sur-Amance, Haute-Marne – 12 January 1986, Haute-Marne) was a French novelist, literary critic, and journalist.

Biography
With René Crevel and Roger Vitrac he founded the dadaist newspaper Aventure. He was awarded the Prix Goncourt for L'Ordre in 1929, and was elected to the French academy in 1968.  He directed the Nouvelle Revue Française from 1968–1977.

References

Arland is referenced by Deleuze & Guattari in Chapter 8 of A Thousand Plateaus. They cite Arland's 1944 work 'Le Promeneur' where he describes the novella as "nothing but pure lines right down to the nuances, and nothing but the pure and conscious power of the word". Arland's view of the novella form accords with Deleuze and Guattari's: that it consists of abstract lines (connections) that constitute subjects and entities by relating them to one another.

Works
Terres étrangères (1923)
Étienne (1925)
Monique (1926)
Les Âmes en peine (1927)
L'Ordre (1929) (Prix Goncourt)
Antarès (1932)
Les Vivants (1934)
La Vigie (1935)
Les Plus Beaux de nos jours (1937)
Terre natale (1938)
La Grâce (1941)
Zélie dans le désert (1944)
Il faut de tout pour faire un monde (1947)
Sidobre (1949)
Essais et nouveaux essais critiques (1952)
Je vous écris... (1960)
L'Eau et le feu (1960)
Je vous écris... La nuit et les sources (1963)
Le Grand Pardon (1965)
Attendez l'aube (1970)

References

External links
  L'Académie française 
 Marcel Arland
 Marcel Arland(French Writer)

1899 births
1986 deaths
People from Haute-Marne
20th-century French novelists
20th-century French male writers
French literary critics
Writers from Grand Est
Prix Goncourt winners
Members of the Académie Française
French male novelists
French male journalists
20th-century French journalists
Nouvelle Revue Française editors